Ning An (  or Níng Ān;   or ; born 8 October 1995 in Guangzhou) is a Chinese football player who currently plays for Guangzhou City.

Club career
Ning An was promoted to Chinese Super League side Guangzhou R&F first team squad by manager Dragan Stojković in 2016. He made his senior debut on 12 March 2016 in a 1–0 away victory against Tianjin Teda, coming on as a substitute for Chang Feiya in the 87th minute. Ning was loaned to Hong Kong Premier League side R&F, which was the satellite team of Guangzhou R&F, in February 2017. He made his debut on 18 February 2017 in a 4–3 away win against Hong Kong FC, coming on as a substitute for Chen Liming in the 69th minute.

Career statistics
Statistics accurate as of match played 5 October 2022.

References

External links
Ning An at Soccerway.com

1995 births
Living people
Association football midfielders
Chinese footballers
Footballers from Guangzhou
Guangzhou City F.C. players
R&F (Hong Kong) players
Chinese Super League players
Hong Kong Premier League players
Guangxi Pingguo Haliao F.C. players